CSN is the eleventh album by Crosby, Stills & Nash, issued on Atlantic Records in 1991, not to be confused with the album of the same name released in 1977. A box set on four compact discs, it features material spanning 1968 through 1990 from their catalogue of recordings as a group in addition to selections from Crosby & Nash, Manassas, and their individual solo albums. It peaked at No. 109 on the Billboard 200, and has been certified platinum by the RIAA. The set is "dedicated to the loving memory of Cass Elliot, without whom most of this music may not have been made." A two-disc distillation of the box was released for other markets later in the year.

Content
The presence of the group's occasional fourth member, Neil Young, is limited to 14 tracks and only two of his compositions for the band, "Helpless" and "Ohio". Of its 77 tracks, 25 had been unreleased previously, although many were alternate takes, alternate mixes, or concert versions of previously issued songs. Included in the unreleased tracks are a CSNY rehearsal of "Helplessly Hoping" prior to their first tour, two outtakes from the Déjà Vu sessions "Horses through a Rainstorm" and "The Lee Shore", and the December 1968 demo of "You Don't Have to Cry", the first recording they made as Crosby, Stills & Nash. Other highlights include a cover of The Beatles' "Blackbird", the full-length take of "Almost Cut My Hair", and three tracks respectively from the aborted CSNY second studio album sessions of 1973, 1974, and 1976: "See the Changes"; "Homeward through the Haze"; and "Taken at All".

No tracks are taken from the following studio albums released either individually or in combination during the time period covered by the box: Down the Road; Illegal Stills; Whistling Down the Wire; Long May You Run; Innocent Eyes; and American Dream.  The orphan single by Young and Nash, "War Song", is also not included and is only available on the Neil Young archives box.

The original recordings were produced by David Crosby, Stephen Stills, Graham Nash, and Neil Young, with assistance from Howard Albert, Ron Albert, Craig Doerge, Bill Halverson, Chris Hillman, Stanley Johnston, Paul Rothchild, Dallas Taylor, and Joe Vitale. Audio engineers on the original recordings include Stephen Barncard, Niko Bolas, Ellen Burke, Larry Cox, Russ Gary, Don Gooch, Steve Gursky, David Hassinger, Andy Johns, Glyn Johns, Gary Kellgren, Henry Lewy, Elliot Mazer, Jim Mitchell, Tim Mulligan, and Doc Storch. The original masters were recorded at the following studios: A&M Studios, Britannia Studios, Devonshire Sound Studio, Wally Heider Studios, The Record Plant, Rudy Recorders, the Sound Lab, Sunset Sound, Sunwest Studio, Village Recorders, and Westlake Audio in Los Angeles; United Studio in Hollywood; The Record Plant in New York City; Wally Heider Studios, His Master's Wheels, and Rudy Recorders in San Francisco; The Record Plant in Sausalito; Criteria Sound Studios in Miami; Island Studios in London; Sol Studio in Maidstone, Kent; Stephen Stills' late 1960s home in Laurel Canyon, Graham Nash's early 1970s home in San Francisco, and Neil Young's Redwood Digital home studio at his ranch in Woodside, California. Live recordings are from the Filmore East in New York in 1970, the Universal Amphitheatre in Los Angeles in 1979, the Arlene Schnitzer Concert Hall in Portland, Oregon in 1982, and the United Nations General Assembly Hall in New York in 1989.

The selections were compiled for this set by Crosby, Stills, Nash, Gerry Tolman, and Yves Beauvais, with additional research by Joel Bernstein. The liner notes include an essay by writer Chet Flippo. Originally in a box set conforming to the size dimensions of a vinyl record, the set was reissued as a compact disc brick on August 13, 2013. The liner notes for the 2013 reissue do not indicate whether or not any additional mastering beyond that from 1991 was undertaken.

Track listing
An asterisk (*) indicates a live recording, two asterisks (**) a previously unreleased mix, (†) a previously unreleased version, and (‡) a previously unreleased song.

Disc one

Disc two

Disc three

Disc four

Collective personnel
 David Crosby — vocals, guitars, keyboards, string arrangements
 Stephen Stills — vocals, guitars, keyboards, bass, banjo, percussion, vibraphone
 Graham Nash — vocals, guitars, keyboards, harmonica, percussion, string arrangements
 Neil Young — vocals, guitars, harmonica, bass, keyboards, vibraphone
 Joel Bernstein, Donnie Dacus, Michael Hedges, Jimi Hendrix, Danny Kortchmar, Michael Landau, Dave Mason, Jimmy Page, Dean Parks, Michael Stergis — guitars
 Chris Hillman, James Taylor — guitars, backing vocals
 Jerry Garcia, Ben Keith, Al Perkins — pedal steel guitar
 Joe Vitale — drums, percussion, keyboards, synthesizers, vibraphone, flute
 David Lindley — fiddle, guitar, mandolin
 Richard T. Bear, Joel Bernstein, Lawrence Dermer, Craig Doerge, Mike Finnigan, Paul Harris, James Newton Howard, Carole King  — keyboards
 Jack Casady, Tim Drummond, Chris Ethridge, Bob Glaub, Phil Lesh, Bruce Palmer, George Perry, Greg Reeves, Calvin "Fuzzy" Samuels, Leland Sklar — bass
 John Barbata, Jim Gordon, Conrad Isidore, Bill Kreutzmann, Russ Kunkel, Paul Lee, Dallas Taylor, Tubby Ziegler — drums
 John Barbata, Michael Fisher, Joe Galdo, Joe Lala, Efrain Toro, Jeff Whittaker — percussion
 Rita Coolidge — backing vocals, vibraphone
 John Sebastian — harmonica, backing vocals
 Patricia Arnold, Joel Bernstein, Gloria Coleman, Henry Diltz, Brenda Lee Eager, Venetta Fields, Art Garfunkel, Priscilla Jones, Cleo Kennedy, Clydie King, Marcy Levy, Sherlie Matthews, Joni Mitchell, Dorothy Morrison, Fred Neil, John Sambataro, Timothy B. Schmit — backing vocals
 Cyrus Faryar — bouzouki
 Dorian Rudnytsky — cello
 Wayne Goodwin, Al Gould — fiddle
 Dana Africa — flute
 Branford Marsalis — soprano saxophone
 George Cricker — trombone
 Tony Concepcion, Al Degooyer — trumpet
 Jimmie Haskell, Mike Lewis, Sid Sharp — string arrangements
 Tony Beard — drum programming

Production personnel
 Graham Nash, Gerry Tolman — producers
 Stephen Barncard at Sunset Sound — 1991 mixes for unreleased material
 Joe Gastwirt, John Modell at Ocean View Digital — digital remastering, July and August 1991
 Joe Gastwirt at Ocean View Digital and John Nowland at Redwood Digital, San Francisco — analog-to-digital tape transfer, June and July 1991
 Joe Gastwirt, John Nowland, Joel Bernstein — tape restoration

Notes

References

Crosby, Stills, Nash & Young compilation albums
1991 compilation albums
Atlantic Records compilation albums
Albums produced by Graham Nash
Albums produced by Paul A. Rothchild
Albums produced by Chris Hillman